Emin Cəbrayıl oğlu Mahmudov (born 27 April 1992) is an Azerbaijani professional footballer who plays as a midfielder for Neftchi Baku, for which he serves as captain, and the Azerbaijan national football team. He was selected as the player of the year in Azerbaijan in 2021.

Club career

Saturn
Emin Mahmudov was born in Saatly, Azerbaijan in 1992. As a child, he moved to Russia with his family and started playing football in the youth academy of FC Saturn Ramenskoye. During the 2010 season, he became the player of the senior team. Mahmudov made his debut in Russian Premier League on 24 April 2010, in a match against Dinamo Moscow, at the age of 17. He scored his first goal at the senior level against Anzhi on 20 November. Mahmudov played a total of 22 matches during his first season in the Premier League.

Spartak Moscow
After the dissolution of Saturn, Mahmudov signed a long-term contract with Spartak Moscow as a free agent on 15 January 2011. Emin played 90 minutes against Rostov in the first game of the 2011-12 season. Mahmudov appeared in a total of 12 matches during the season for Spartak, however despite a successful start, he was not able to become the player of the main squad. During the 3 seasons between 2012 and 2014, Mahmudov played on loan for Premier League teams Tomsk and Krylia Sovetov and also played for the reserve team of Spartak.

Krylia Sovetov
After a one-year loan, Krylia Sovetov purchased Emin Mahmudov from Spartak on January 31, 2014, for €250,000. The same season Krylia got relegated from the Premier League. However, the 2014-15 season Krylia Sovetov became the champions of Russian Football National League and won the promotion to Premier League again. Emin missed most of that season due to a fractured leg injury that he received in September 2014.

Emin Mahmudov made his comeback to the Russian Premier League on 9 August 2015, during the game against his previous team Spartak Moscow. On August 31, it was announced that Emin Mahmudov would play on loan at Mordovia Saransk until the end of the 2015-16 season. Mahmudov made his debut for Mordovia on September 20 and soon became one of the regular members of the starting squad.

Boavista
On 21 July 2016 he signed a two-year contract with Boavista. Mahmudov debuted for the Boavista in Primeira Liga match against Sporting Lisbon on 26 November 2016. On 23 December 2016, Mahmudov scored his first goal for the club, away against Nacional, in Primeira Liga.

Neftchi Baku
On 18 September 2017, Neftchi Baku signed with Mahmudov until the end of 2017-18 season. Mahmudov made his Azerbaijan Premier League debut for Neftchi Baku against Gabala on 24 September 2017. He scored his first goal for Neftchi Baku in the Azerbaijan Premier League match against Gabala on 19 November 2017. On 17 June 2018, Mahmudov a new contract with Neftçi PFK until the end of the 2019/20 season. In summer of 2019, after the departure of Ruslan Abishov, Emin became the new captain of club.

After finishing the league with second place for two years in a row, Emin greatly contributed to Neftchi's championship in the 2020-2021 season of the Azerbaijan Premier League. Due to his performance at both Neftchi and the national team, he was selected as the player of the year in Azerbaijan during the vote at the end of 2021.

International career
As a dual citizen of Azerbaijan and Russia, Emin was eligible to play for both countries. Mahmudov played for Azerbaijani youth national teams until 2007, and played for all youth levels of Russian national team until 2014. Mahmudov twice became the champion of Commonwealth of Independent States Cup in 2012 and 2013 with the Russian under-21 team.

Mahmudov decided to play for the Azerbaijan national football team in 2016. He made his debut in a 1-0 win over San Marino in the 2018 World Cup qualification.

In 2021, Mahmudov set multiple new records for the national team by becoming the first player to score 7 international goals in a single year and 4 goals in a single qualification event, as part of the 2022 World Cup qualification tournament.

He is currently ranked as the second highest all-time goalscorer in the history of the national team with 9 goals (tied with Ramil Sheydayev and Vagif Javadov).

Career statistics

International
Statistics accurate as of match played 5 December 2022.

International goals
Scores and results list Azerbaijan's goal tally first.

Honours

Club
Neftchi Baku
Azerbaijan Premier League: 2020–21
Krylia Sovetov
Russian Football National League: 2014–15

Individual
Azerbaijani Footballer of the Year: 2021

International
Russia national under-21
Commonwealth of Independent States Cup: 2012, 2013

References

External links

 
  Profile by the Russian Football Premier League
  Profile at FC Saturn website

1992 births
Living people
Association football midfielders
Azerbaijani footballers
Azerbaijan international footballers
Russian footballers
Russia youth international footballers
Russia under-21 international footballers
Azerbaijani expatriate footballers
Expatriate footballers in Portugal
Azerbaijani expatriate sportspeople in Portugal
Russian Premier League players
Primeira Liga players
Azerbaijan Premier League players
FC Saturn Ramenskoye players
FC Spartak Moscow players
FC Tom Tomsk players
PFC Krylia Sovetov Samara players
FC Mordovia Saransk players
Boavista F.C. players
Azerbaijani emigrants to Russia
Naturalised citizens of Russia
Neftçi PFK players